Cambourne railway station is a proposed new railway station to serve Cambourne in Cambridgeshire.  It would be situated on the central section of the proposed East West Rail OxfordCambridge line.

Location
In March 2021, the East West Railway Company opened an 'informal consultation' on proposals for the Central section's route alignment and thus the location of this station. Two sites are considered, one just south of the village and the other across the A428 from it: the latter is preferred.

See also
 East West Rail#Central section
 Tempsford railway station 
 St Neots South railway station
 Cambridge South railway station (proposed)

References

Cambourne
Rail transport in Cambridgeshire
Proposed railway stations in England
East West Rail